Richard J. Holmberg (March 17, 1931 in Chicago, Illinois – December 30, 2003 in Nellysford, Virginia) was a sailor from United States Virgin Islands. Holmberg represented his country at the 1972 Summer Olympics in Kiel. Holmberg took 24th place in the Soling with David Jones and David Kelly as fellow crew members.

References

External links
 
 
 

1931 births
2003 deaths
United States Virgin Islands male sailors (sport)
Olympic sailors of the United States Virgin Islands
Sailors at the 1972 Summer Olympics – Soling
American sportsmen
Sportspeople from Chicago